The Netherlands national cricket team toured New Zealand in March 1988 and played two matches against teams representing various regions of New Zealand. The touring Dutch team was captained by Peter Entrop.

Matches

References

1988 in Dutch cricket
1988 in New Zealand cricket
Dutch cricket tours abroad
New Zealand cricket seasons from 1970–71 to 1999–2000